Anterior horn disease is one of a number of medical disorders affecting the anterior horn of the spinal cord. Anterior horn diseases include spinal muscular atrophy, poliomyelitis and amyotrophic lateral sclerosis.

References

Central nervous system disorders